I.M.A. Gujju is a 2018 Gujarati patriotic drama film, starring veteran Bollywood actor Rohit Roy, Manoj Joshi, Sunny Pancholi, Shriya Tiwari, Parth Thaker and Rushikesh Ingley. The film is directed by Sunny Pancholi and scheduled for release on 16 November 2018; it is produced by Viral Jain from E3 Productions. Nationwide Release by Rupam Entertainment.

Cast 
 Rohit Roy as Siddhraj Zala
 Manoj Joshi as Ramesh Shah
 Sunny Pancholi as Jay Shah
 Parth Thakar as Darbar 
 Shriya Tiwari as Bhoomi
Rushikesh Ingley as Aditya

Crew 

A Film by: Sunny Pancholi

Produced by: Viral Jain

Co Produced by: Ronak Bathani, Vimal B Bhalodiya, Vikram P Gojiya, Nitin A Kothari

Associate Director: Mahesh Chavan

DOP: Chandrakant Meher

Story: Sunny Pancholi

Screenplay: Akhilesh Tiwari, Sunny Pancholi 

Art Director: Setu Upadhyay

Production

Development 
The film is produced Viral Jain from E3 Productions. The pre production work of the film started in 2016 and shoot completed in three scheduled. Where main lead Sunny Pancholi has undergone the body transformation for this film and loved Ahmedabad during the festival season

References 

2018 films
Films shot in India
Films set in Ahmedabad
Films shot in Ahmedabad
Films shot in Gujarat
2010s Gujarati-language films